The 2009 G20 Pittsburgh Summit was the third meeting of the G20 heads of state/heads of government to discuss financial markets and the world economy.

The G20 is the premier forum for discussing, planning and monitoring international economic 
cooperation.

The summit was held at the David L. Lawrence Convention Center in Pittsburgh, Pennsylvania, United States on September 24–25, 2009. Announced shortly after the April 2009 G20 London summit, U.S. President Barack Obama volunteered to host this summit, initially planning to hold it in New York City and coordinating it with the opening of the United Nations General Assembly. However, due to coordination issues, on May 28, 2009, the Obama Administration announced a change of venue to Pittsburgh in order to highlight the city's economic recovery following the collapse of its manufacturing sector in the latter half of the 20th century. In response to the Global credit crisis, a G20 summit in one year was proposed shortly after the London summit in April 2009.

Amongst the issues discussed was a proposal to radically reform the International Monetary Fund (IMF). French President Nicolas Sarkozy also suggested that there would be an evaluation of measures already taken.

The primary venue of the summit was the David L. Lawrence Convention Center, which was at one point the largest Leadership in Energy and Environmental Design certified building in the world. A working dinner for world leaders was held at the Phipps Conservatory & Botanical Gardens, chosen to highlight its environmentally friendly features including an earth-sheltered welcome center and a Tropical Forest Conservatory described as the world's most energy efficient. Other venues used around the city include The Andy Warhol Museum, the Pittsburgh High School for the Creative and Performing Arts and Rosemont, the working farm of Teresa Heinz Kerry.

Preparations
In the weeks leading up to the conference, many measures were taken to prepare Pittsburgh for the conference. Many streets in Downtown Pittsburgh were re-paved and a pre-season National Hockey League hockey game for the Pittsburgh Penguins at nearby Mellon Arena was rescheduled. During the week of the G20, many streets were closed, and traffic patterns were adjusted. Many public schools, universities and nearby businesses were closed, canceling classes or working remotely for the duration of the conference. Pittsburgh Mayor Luke Ravenstahl also attempted to alleviate problems by meeting beforehand with some of the groups expected to protest during the event.

Security
Thousands of protesters were expected during the week of the Summit, which was classified as a National Special Security Event. Security was coordinated by the United States Secret Service, working in conjunction with the Pittsburgh Police. It is estimated that 4,000 police officers were requested, and the city only had 900 police officers at the time of the event. The Pennsylvania State Police committed more than 1,000 officers for the downtown event, including SWAT, helicopter, mounted, undercover, bicycle and motorcycle officers. Allegheny County had 75 officers specifically trained by and embedded into the Pittsburgh Police Bureau for the event since June. New York City and Baltimore also committed some officers, as well as Pittsburgh suburbs. Some officers from Chicago traveled to assist, taking vacation days from their department. All officers, regardless of department, were under the command of the Secret Service for the event days.

Chinook and Black Hawk helicopters, armored Humvees and crews of U.S. Army soldiers, as well as 10 25-foot boats with M240 machine guns from the Coast Guard, were on hand in the event of large-scale violent protests or a terrorist attack.

Attendance

G20 leaders began gathering in Pittsburgh on September 24, 2009. On the evening of September 24, the leaders attended a reception at Phipps Conservatory in the Oakland neighborhood of Pittsburgh.

The Summit proper began on the morning of September 25 at the David L. Lawrence Convention Center, downtown.

Core participants
The following participants of the Pittsburgh summit represented the core members of the G20, which includes 19 countries and the European Union which is represented by its two governing bodies, the European Council and the European Commission.

Protests

After numerous denials of permits for groups such as Code Pink and Three Rivers Climate Convergence to assemble peaceful demonstrations, the ACLU of Pennsylvania successfully sued to force the city of Pittsburgh to allow demonstrations around the G20 Summit.

Participants in the protests surrounding the summit included peace, environmental, labor and social justice organizations.

The first of the alternate events was a Peoples' Summit, involving an all-day session of speakers, panels and workshops on September 19, the Saturday before the G20 Summit, drawing about 500 participants, and continuing on Monday and Tuesday evenings, each drawing between 100 and 200. The Peoples' Summit included outright opponents of the G20 (such as radical historian Howard Zinn, who addressed the gathering via special video) as well as some who hoped to influence it in what they considered to be "progressive" directions. The Pittsburgh City Council proclaimed "that the Council of the City of Pittsburgh does hereby commend the Peoples' Summit, all associated institutions and organizations, and the citizen volunteers who worked tirelessly to make it a success. Their outstanding efforts are certain to create a greater understanding about the challenges we face, the solutions we should explore and the social dialogue that is necessary for the realization of a better world. Furthermore, the citizens of our region are encouraged to seize the opportunity to participate in this significant and historic event." The Peoples' Summit itself advanced some of the themes that surfaced in protests when the G20 Summit actually met: "We envision a world in which basic rights—freedom of expression, freedom of thought and religion, freedom from fear, and freedom from want—are enjoyed by all people. This is not the reality of our world today. Yet, in our diversity and plurality of orientations, inspired by mutual respect and the spirit of solidarity, we share the conviction that another world is possible."

This was followed by a number of tent cities, demonstrations and other summits. There was also an alternative conference on Tuesday called the Freedom Conference 2009, stressing conservative grassroots solutions and free-market approaches.

At around 10:15 a.m. on Wednesday, September 23, Greenpeace activists hung a banner, warning of the dangers of increased CO2 emissions, from the deck of the West End Bridge facing downtown Pittsburgh over the Ohio River. While traffic was held up for a period, all eight activists were placed under arrest after surrendering peacefully.

On Thursday, September 24, the Pittsburgh G20 Resistance Project held a march and a day of direct action at Arsenal Park in the city's Lawrenceville neighborhood. Police fired pepper spray at a crowd of an estimated 500 demonstrators to disperse a protest march a few hours before the start of the Summit.

Police also used a Long Range Acoustic Device (LRAD) to remove protesters from an area after warning them several times to disperse.  This was believed by city officials to be the first time that an LRAD had been used to disperse protesters within the United States.  Since then, LRADs have been used to peacefully disperse crowds on several occasions.

Later in the evening, another small crowd gathered in Schenley Plaza, as world leaders met that evening at the Phipps Conservatory nearby for a working dinner. Hundreds of police swarmed and encircled the peaceful crowd, which spilled over onto Forbes Avenue and Bigelow Boulevard near the Cathedral of Learning. An estimated 300 riot police lined the sidewalk behind the William Pitt Union, with 200 more officers blocking Forbes Avenue nearby to contain the protesters. However, the crowd quickly grew to about 500 as nearby University of Pittsburgh students—evident by shouts of "Let's Go Pitt!" heard—curious about the sirens and police presence, joined the crowd. Police shot several rounds of pepper spray into the crowd. Nearby businesses along Forbes Avenue and Craig Street were also vandalized after the police attempted to break up the demonstration. The University of Pittsburgh alerted students via text message that, "Conditions may be deteriorating in Oakland. Students are advised to remain near their residences."

The Pittsburgh G20 Resistance Project called for "Everywhere Protests" at various locations and businesses (mostly banks and large corporations) throughout the city Friday morning (September 25). These were not very large scale protests. Some protesters wore black and twirled hula hoops at Forbes Avenue and Atwood Street in the Oakland neighborhood. There was also a small gathering of protesters at a Starbucks Coffee on Centre Avenue in the city's East Liberty neighborhood as well.

Yet Friday also saw massive actions involving a broad coalition headed by the pacifist-oriented Thomas Merton Center. As one speaker emphasized at the action's start, said, "I remind you, this is a peaceful, permitted march. We're confronting G20 policies, not police." This "Peoples' March" (linked in the minds of many with issues raised in the earlier Peoples' Summit) was punctuated by three rallies (following the route of the march, in Oakland, in downtown Pittsburgh on the steps of City Hall, and on Pittsburgh's North Side), with an estimated 5000 to 8000 participants. The demonstration was quite diverse, including religious and community activists, anarchists, socialists, environmentalists, human rights advocates, opponents of war, trade unionists, veterans, and others. The mood of the action tended to be uncompromisingly critical of the G20, of big corporations, and of capitalism as such. "We're rallying here just a few miles from where the corporate robber barons have settled down to divide up the planet, that group of bankers, financiers and political leaders who have wreaked havoc upon our world," proclaimed one of the speakers, urging listeners to "fight for another world, put people before profits." The crowd roared with approval, and others spoke in a similar vein, but the assembly was completely free from violence and arrests.

Much of the news media tended to minimize peaceful protests, however, and gave greater attention to arrests. These included controversial police actions of Friday evening, after the G20 Summit and the organized protests had ended. Taking place in Schenley Plaza and at the nearby University of Pittsburgh campus, they involved more sweeping arrests, and more charges of police violence, than had been the case the night before.

According to police accounts, about 4,500 people participated in protests throughout the city, with 190 arrests being made. Approximately $50,000 worth of damage was caused to area businesses, with $15,000 worth being attributed to one individual, David Japenga of California, accused of breaking 20 windows and doors in Oakland on Thursday night.

New York City activist Elliott "Smokey" Madison used Twitter to report an order to disperse message from the Pittsburgh police during the protests. Police raided Madison's hotel room, and one week later Madison's New York home, Tortuga House, was raided by FBI agents. Police claim Madison and a co-defendant used computers and a radio scanner to track police movements and then passed on that information to protesters using cell phones and the social networking site Twitter. Madison was charged with hindering apprehension or prosecution, criminal use of a communication facility, and possession of instruments of crime. All protesters that were arrested were processed and held at the State Correctional Institution - Pittsburgh.

Response
Dozens of University of Pittsburgh students who say they were wrongfully arrested and subjected to heavy-handed police tactics during the G20 meeting called for an investigation into the police actions.

Outcome
One of the first major announcements to come out of the meeting was that the group will become the new permanent council for international economic cooperation. This means that the much larger G20 meeting will essentially replace the smaller G8, which will continue to meet on major security issues but will carry reduced influence. This decision will help to include major developing nations – such as China, India and Brazil – which were originally not included in the G8.

References

Further reading

External links

G20 Information Centre
 Graphic: G20 is not simply the 20 largest economies
Official Website
Official Partnership Site
G20 Media Project

G-20 Protests Turn Violent - slideshow by Life magazine
Police Crackdown on G20 Protests - video report by Democracy Now!
Fortress Pittsburgh by Robert S. Eshelman, The Nation, September 25, 2009

 From London to Pittsburgh: assessing G20 action for developing countries, Eurodad, September 2009

2009 in economics
2009,09,Pittsburgh
2009 in the United States
2000s in Pittsburgh
2009 conferences
National Special Security Events
2009 in international relations
2009 in Pennsylvania
September 2009 events in the United States
Events in Pittsburgh
21st-century diplomatic conferences (Global)